Jesse Grant Chapline (13 January 1870 – 4 July 1937) was an American educator and politician who founded distance learning facility La Salle Extension University (LSEU) in Chicago.

Life and career
Born in Waverly, Missouri, he graduated from Saint Louis College. He founded LSEU in 1908. Chapline hired Napoleon Hill as LSEU advertising manager and is acknowledged as an inspiration in Hill's best-seller Think and Grow Rich.

He served as director of the Commercial Research Association, manager of John Wanamaker's Century Club in Philadelphia, and as president of the Associated Publishing Company. Chapline died in Chicago, Illinois.

References

1870 births
1937 deaths
Saint Louis University alumni
People from Lafayette County, Missouri
Politicians from Chicago